Stanley William Herbert Cowley   (born 1947) is a British physicist, emeritus Professor of Solar Planetary Physics at the University of Leicester.

Career
He was educated at Caludon Castle School, Coventry, and Imperial College, London, graduating with first class honours in physics in 1968. He was awarded a Ph.D by Imperial in 1972. He had a visiting Scholarship at the University of Colorado in 1972–73 before returning to Imperial, where he became a Lecturer in 1982, Reader in 1985 and Professor in 1988. He was appointed Head of the Space and Atmospheric Physics Group at Imperial in 1990 before moving in 1996 to the University of Leicester as Head of the Radio and Space Plasma Physics group.

His primary research interest is the physical processes that shape the outer plasma environments of Earth and the magnetised planets.

Honours and awards
2011: Elected a Fellow of the Royal Society
2006: Julius Bartels Medal of the European Geosciences Union
2006: Gold Medal of the Royal Astronomical Society for Geophysics
1995: Elected a Fellow of the American Geophysical Union
1991: Chapman Medal of the Royal Astronomical Society

References

1947 births
Living people
Alumni of Imperial College London
Fellows of the American Geophysical Union
Fellows of the Royal Society
Recipients of the Gold Medal of the Royal Astronomical Society